Joseph Crawhall may refer to:

 Joseph Crawhall II (1821–1896), English ropemaker, author, and watercolour painter
 Joseph Crawhall III (1861–1913), his son, English artist